Logorama is a 2009 French adult animated short film co-written and directed by François Alaux, Hervé de Crécy and Ludovic Houplain (H5), and produced by Autour de Minuit. Set in a stylized version of Los Angeles, the short portrays events told entirely through the extensive use of more than 2,000 contemporary and historical logos and mascots. The film won both the Prix Kodak at the 2009 Cannes Film Festival and the Academy Award for Best Animated Short Film at the 82nd Academy Awards in 2010.

A catalog based on the short, titled Logobook and written by the film's co-director Ludovic Houplain, was published by Taschen in 2013.

Plot
The short opens with a panorama of Los Angeles where all of its buildings and inhabitants are in some form of commercial branding: birds are in the form of Bentley and Aston Martin logos and MSN's butterfly; pedestrians are in the shape of the AIM icon; and overhead highway signs are mounted on Atlantic Records logos, among others. The Original Pringles mascot (voiced by David Fincher) pulls into a Pizza Hut restaurant's parking lot and propositions an Esso Girl waitress (voiced by Aja Evans) on a smoking break (her cigarette is the Air France logo). Meanwhile, BiC Boy students alongside Bob's Big Boy (voiced by Joel Michaely) and Haribo Boy (voiced by Matt Winston) are on a tour at a zoo led by a flamboyant Mr. Clean (voiced by Michaely); hating the tour, Big Boy and Haribo Boy hop off the tour train and soon begin to harass the MGM lion by mooning and throwing a bottle of Coca-Cola at it, prompting the zoo's owner, the Jolly Green Giant (voiced by Michaely), to scold them.

As Michelin Man police officers Mitch and Mike (voiced by Bob Stephenson and Sherman Augustus) order lunch at KFC, a call comes in over the radio stating that a criminal named Ronald McDonald (voiced by Stephenson) is on the loose in a red delivery truck; both Mitch and Mike spot Ronald in his truck and chase him. The police pursuit quickly veers out of control, as many innocent bystanders are imperiled/injured. Meanwhile, the BiC students alongside Big Boy and Haribo Boy at the zoo have finished their tour and are back on the school bus, soon nearing the Pizza Hut where Esso Girl is serving the Original Pringles mascot and the Pringles Hot & Spicy mascot. Ronald swerves to avoid the school bus and crashes his truck over in front of the Pizza Hut. Several guns and biological weapons then spill out of the back of the truck, tempting Big Boy and Haribo Boy to steal and sell them at the black market. Ronald gets out of the truck and knocks out Haribo Boy with his foot, before taking Big Boy hostage and running inside the Pizza Hut. Big Boy frees himself by biting Ronald in the arm, before running for cover behind the counter with Esso Girl while an enraged Ronald attempts to shoot him. The police are given the excuse to start firing on Ronald, but Ronald kills one of the police officers.

As the gunfight ensues in the streets, a low rumbling is heard across Los Angeles, resulting in a giant earthquake erupting and opening a fissure shaped like Microsoft's Xbox logo that splits the streets wide open. Big Boy and Esso Girl escape the rapidly collapsing Pizza Hut using a hijacked police car while the Original Pringles mascot and the Pringles Hot & Spicy mascot are both crushed inside. After shooting Mitch with his gun (as shown via the gun barrel sequence à la James Bond), Ronald rides through the city on a stolen Grease 2 motorcycle, but drives into a fallen Weight Watchers sign and is thrown off, sliding and falling into a crevasse shaped like the Zenith Electronics logo. As he pulls himself back up, he is run over by Esso Girl and Big Boy, who barely escape the city and speed along a curved highway shaped like the VAIO logo. As the duo near the Hollywood Chewing Gum Hollywood Sign, it falls apart and sends the giant letters crashing onto the highway in front of them. While evading one of the letters, the duo veer off the highway and down a hill, finally crashing into a tree shaped like the American Century Investments logo. Following this, petroleum oil suddenly erupts from the rifts around town and entirely floods Los Angeles.

The hill Esso Girl and Big Boy are stranded on splits into two, revealing a giant North Face logo while the land crumbles around them, swallowed by the sea and leaving the duo on a tiny island together. The film closes with Esso Girl picking up and biting a colored Apple Inc. logo while lying down on the island alongside Big Boy, before zooming out to reveal that California has been separated from mainland and is now shaped like the Nike, Inc. logo, but also revealing that the entire universe is made up of even more logos. After the credits, a now-bald, black-eyed and partly-toothless Ronald laughs menacingly and says "I'm lovin' it!"

Cast
 Bob Stephenson – Ronald McDonald, Michelin Man Police Officer Mike
 David Fincher – Original Pringles Mascot
 Aja Evans – Esso Girl
 Sherman Augustus – Michelin Man Police Officer Mitch 
 Joel Michaely – Big Boy, Jolly Green Giant, Mr. Clean 
 Matt Winston – Haribo Boy
 Gregory J. Pruss – Pillsbury Doughboy, Chopper Pilot
 Josh Eichenbaum – M&M's
 Jaime Ray Newman – Dispatch Girl (Radio)
 Andrew Kevin Walker as Pringles Hot & Spicy

Themes
Logorama explores the extent to which logos are embedded in Earth's daily existence. H5 members explained that, "Logorama presents us with an over-marketed world built only from logos and real trademarks that are destroyed by a series of natural disasters (including an earthquake and a tidal wave of oil). Logotypes are used to describe an alarming universe (similar to the one that we are living in) with all the graphic signs that accompany us  in our lives. This over-organized universe is violently transformed by the cataclysm becoming fantastic and absurd. It shows the victory of the creative against the rational, where nature and human fantasy triumph".

Brands, mascots and logos

The entirety of Logorama is made up of brand images, logos and mascots, with these brand images, logos and mascots used as characters, props, locations, vehicles and other content. Notable uses within the film include McDonald's mascot Ronald McDonald being depicted as the main antagonist, while Michelin Men are depicted as the police. However, some of the logos are also derived from fictional works, such as Slurm from Futurama, the Ghostbusters logo, the Buy-N-Large (BnL) sign from WALL-E, the South Park sign and logo of My First Thomas, a Thomas & Friends toyline.

Awards
Logorama has received the following nominations and awards:
 Kodak Discovery Award for Best Short Film (the Kodak Prix) - Critics' Week, 62nd Cannes Film Festival (2009) – Won
 Audience Award – Festival International de Curtas Metragans (2009) – Nominated
 Audience Award – Lille International Short Film Festival (2009) – Nominated
 Jury's Special Prize, Audience Prize, Fuji Prize for Best Directors – Cinanima International Animated Film Festival (2009) – Nominated
 Best Short Film – Stockholm International Film Festival (2009) – Nominated
 Best Direction, Audience Award – Vendôme Film Festival (2009) – Nominated 
 Gold Medal for Animation – Zinebi, Bilbao International Film Festival (2009) – Nominated
 Oscar for Best Animated Short – 82nd Academy Awards (2010) – Won
 Best Short Film – Césars 2011 – Nominated

In other media
The 2012 Simpsons episode "A Tree Grows in Springfield" ends with a vignette inspired by Logorama called Logomania.

See also 
 Foodfight! - A 2012 animated film that also features product mascots as characters; seen as one of the worst animated films of all time.
 Criticism of capitalism
Product placement

References

External links
 Logorama on Vimeo
 Logorama on YouTube
 

2009 films
2000s French-language films
2009 animated films
2009 short films
2000s crime action films
2000s chase films
2000s disaster films
2000s satirical films
2000s animated short films
French animated short films
French crime action films
French disaster films
French satirical films
Best Animated Short Academy Award winners
Animated action films
Criticisms of companies
Films set in Los Angeles
Films set in restaurants
Films set in zoos
Films about earthquakes
Films about tsunamis
Films about police officers
Films about clowns
Mascots
Logos
2000s English-language films
French adult animated films
2009 multilingual films
French multilingual films
2000s French films